Bugseed is a common name for a plant that may refer to:

Corispermum, Chenopodiaceae
Dicoria canescens, Asteraceae